Janette DuCharme is a fictional character from the TV show Forever Knight. She appeared as a regular in the first and second seasons, and as a guest in one episode of season three. She was played by American actress Cec Verrell in the pilot movie Nick Knight. In the series, she was played by Canadian actress Deborah Duchêne.

Janette is a vampire who introduces Nick Knight to Lucien LaCroix in 1228. She and LaCroix convince Nick to become a vampire. She also served as Nick's love interest during part of the series. During the 1990s, she also operates a club named "The Raven" which was patronized by other vampires and also by humans, located in Toronto. Janette left the city in 1995, and the vampire Lucien LaCroix took over the bar.

Further reading
  The Vampire Gallery: A Who's who of the Undead by J. Gordon Melton, Visible Ink (1998)

References

Fictional vampires
Forever Knight
Television characters introduced in 1989